Jeam Abad is a town near Mashad in the east of Iran near its border with Afghanistan.

Populated places in Razavi Khorasan Province